Pauline Hope Chalamet (born January 25, 1992) is a French and American actress, writer and director. She made her feature film debut in Judd Apatow's comedy The King of Staten Island. Chalamet stars in the HBO Max original comedy The Sex Lives of College Girls as Kimberly. Chalamet is a co-founder of the production company Gummy Films, set up in 2019.

Early life
Chalamet was born in New York City, the first child of Nicole Flender and Marc Chalamet, and grew up in the federally subsidized artists' building Manhattan Plaza, in Hell's Kitchen. Her younger brother is actor Timothée Chalamet. Her mother, Nicole Flender, is a third-generation New Yorker, of half Russian Jewish and half Austrian Jewish descent. Flender is a real estate broker at The Corcoran Group, and a former Broadway dancer; Flender earned her bachelor's degree in French from Yale University, and has been a language and dance teacher. Her French father, Marc Chalamet, is an editor for the UNICEF and former New York correspondent for Le Parisien. Marc Chalamet is from Nîmes and is of a Protestant Christian background. Chalamet's paternal grandmother, who moved to France, was Canadian.

Chalamet is bilingual in English and French. In 2001, she began taking classes at the School of American Ballet, and at age 10, danced in a Broadway production of A Midsummer Night's Dream. She attended until 2010, after a biking accident hindered any chances of furthering her dancing career. Although she was ambivalent about a career in acting, she recalls seeing Liev Schreiber act in Talk Radio in 2006 as a pivotal moment in her decision. After going to different schools, she was accepted at Fiorello H. LaGuardia High School, where she majored in drama, and graduated in 2010. At first, she rejected the idea of going to college, but finally applied to Bard College, where she double majored in theater and political science, graduating in 2014. While studying, Chalamet worked at the school library and helped out at a farm to pay off her student loans. She interned at International Crisis Group, and for a while thought of becoming a human-rights lawyer, but quickly discarded the idea. After college, Chalamet worked various odd jobs, including bartending, copyediting, and babysitting, while writing in her free time. She decided to move to Paris without her family's knowledge. "I told my family after I had signed a lease", she has said. In 2016, she was accepted for an acting apprenticeship at the Studio Théâtre d'Asnières, where she regained her interest in acting. While in Paris, she got a New York-based agent, and auditioned while visiting her family.

Career

1999–2020: Early roles
Chalamet started her career with small roles in television shows such as One Life to Live and Royal Pains. Since 2016 she has worked in short films like Je Suis Mes Actes and Between Fear and Laughter, which she wrote and directed. In 2017, she wrote Agnes et Milane, directed by Tristan Tilloloy, appeared in Margot, and starred in Gravats by Hong Kai Lai. She also starred in the Canadian television pilot La Ville. In 2018, she wrote the short The Group Chat and appeared in En Ville. In 2019, Chalamet wrote another short, Entre Deux Mondes, directed by Myriam Doumenq, and starred as Marion in Comme des Grands, directed by Ania Gauer and Julien Gauthier, for which she won the Best Actress Award at the IndieXFilmFest section of the Los Angeles International Film Festival. The next year she starred in another three short films: Je Suis la Nouvelle Adjani by Khady N'Diaye, Seasick by Lindsey Ryan, and Canines by Abel Danan, which was selected for the Festival international du film fantastique de Gérardmer.

2020–present
In 2019, Chalamet was cast as Joanne in the Judd Apatow comedy The King of Staten Island, which premiered in 2020. That same year, she co-founded the production company Gummy Films with Rachel Walden and Luca Balser. In 2020, she appeared as Sveta in two episodes of the French webseries Les Engagés. On October 14, 2020, Variety reported that Chalamet was set to star as Kimberly, "the valedictorian of a working-class public high school in a humble Arizona suburb", in Mindy Kaling's comedy The Sex Lives of College Girls for HBO Max. She will next appear in Iris Brey's Split, a French television series, alongside Alma Jodorowsky and Jehnny Beth.

Personal life
As of 2022, Chalamet lives in Paris, and splits her time between New York City and Los Angeles. She is an avid reader and has a book club with her friends. On average she reads one book a week, with her favourite being Alexandre Dumas's The Count of Monte Cristo.

Credits

Film

Television

Awards and nominations

References

External links

1992 births
Living people
21st-century American actresses
21st-century French actresses
American film actresses
American television actresses
American child actresses
American people of Austrian-Jewish descent
American people of Canadian descent
American people of French descent
American people of Russian-Jewish descent
Bard College alumni
Fiorello H. LaGuardia High School alumni
School of American Ballet alumni
French people of Austrian-Jewish descent
French people of Canadian descent
French people of Russian-Jewish descent
Jewish American actresses
Actresses from New York City
21st-century American Jews